Andreas Vasev (born 1 March 1991) is a Bulgarian footballer who plays as a right back or winger for Montana.

Career

Cherno More
On 30 June 2015 he signed with the Bulgarian Cup champion Cherno More Varna from Dunav Ruse. Vasev debuted for the team on 12 August 2015 in the Bulgarian Supercup match against PFC Ludogorets Razgrad which was won by Cherno More, thus becoming Superchampions of Bulgaria. He made his professional debut for the team in the A Group on 19 July 2015 in the match against Pirin Blagoevgrad.

Dunav Ruse
On 15 June 2017, Vasev returned to Dunav Ruse.

Career statistics

Club

Honours

Club
Cherno More
 Bulgarian Supercup: 2015

References

External links

1991 births
Living people
Bulgarian footballers
FC Sportist Svoge players
OFC Pirin Blagoevgrad players
PFC Minyor Pernik players
FC Dunav Ruse players
PFC Cherno More Varna players
FC Montana players
FC Botev Vratsa players
First Professional Football League (Bulgaria) players
Association football defenders
Association football midfielders